Plagiopholis delacouri is a species of snake in the family Colubridae. The species is found in Laos and Vietnam.

References

Plagiopholis
Reptiles of Laos
Reptiles of Vietnam
Reptiles described in 1929
Taxa named by Fernand Angel